Shiri (also Romanized as Shīrī) is a village in Soviren Rural District, Cham Khalaf-e Isa District, Hendijan County, Khuzestan Province, Iran. At the 2006 census, its population was 225, in 40 families.

References 

Populated places in Hendijan County